Christopher Lee Jacke (born March 12, 1966) is a former professional American football placekicker best known for playing for the Green Bay Packers in the National Football League (NFL).

Before his NFL career, Jacke played collegiately at the University of Texas at El Paso. He was drafted by the Green Bay Packers in the sixth round of the 1989 NFL Draft. He went on to play eight seasons with the Packers from 1989 to 1996. In his last year with the Packers, he assisted them to a 13–3 record and a win in Super Bowl XXXI, defeating the New England Patriots. In 1997, Jacke became a free agent and was signed by the Pittsburgh Steelers. During training camp he was injured and never played a game for them. Later that season he was signed by the Washington Redskins, only playing in one game. He finished his football career with the Arizona Cardinals for the 1998 and 1999 NFL seasons.

Jacke previously held a record for the longest field goal to end overtime (53 yards) and is fourth behind Mason Crosby, Ryan Longwell and Don Hutson all time for the Packers in scoring.

Jacke was a first-team AP All-Pro in 1993 and is a 2013 inductee into the Green Bay Packers Hall of Fame.

References

	

1966 births
Living people
American football placekickers
UTEP Miners football players
Green Bay Packers players
Washington Redskins players
Arizona Cardinals players
Players of American football from Richmond, Virginia
Players of American football from Texas
People from Richardson, Texas